Stephen William Shaw (December 15, 1817 – February 12, 1900) was a California '49er and portrait painter who helped discover and name Humboldt Bay and introduced viticulture to Sonoma County by 1864.

Early life
Stephen W. Shaw was born December 15, 1817, at Windsor, Vermont, to Seth and Elizabeth Barrett Shaw, descendants of Puritans and American Revolutionaries. As a young adult, Shaw taught drawing and penmanship at Norwich Military Academy, and in Wooster, Ohio, between 1841-1842, Shaw advertised to execute portraits in Crayon in Wooster, Ohio in September 1842, then became an art teacher and director of the Boston Athenaeum before moving to the American South and making his living as an itinerant portraitist. In 1845, shortly after opening a studio in Lexington, Kentucky, Shaw painted his first known oil portrait. A year later, in Baton Rouge, Shaw painted a portrait of General Zachary Taylor which won a silver medal at the American Institute. In 1848, Shaw was commissioned for $1,000 by the City of New Orleans for a portrait of native son Persifer F. Smith. Shaw traveled to Veracruz and Mexico City, painting the portrait on his return to New Orleans.

Joining the California Gold Rush, Shaw left New Orleans aboard the merchant steamer Isthmus, on April 21, 1849. After crossing the Isthmus of Panama, he booked passage on the Dutch bark, Alexander von Humboldt, which left Panama on May 20, 1849. Becalmed for five weeks, they reached Acapulco July 6 where the passengers forced the owners off the boat due to poor provisioning and overcrowding. After more than three months voyage, the ship finally arrived in San Francisco, August 30, 1849 and was sold for $17,000 to satisfy the passengers' lien against the owners. One of the other passengers, Collis P. Huntington, formed an association of the 365 survivors of the 102-day passage, called "The Society of the Humboldter." Huntington sponsored reunions and at least one commemorative poster; the last four members met on August 30, 1899.

Contrary to at least one published report, neither ships' manifest lists Shaw's brother Seth Shaw who was elsewhere reported to have crossed the country overland in 1850. Huntington, a large group of fellow passengers, and Stephen Shaw immediately went to the gold mines at Mormon Island for about six months, then Shaw moved to Sacramento for February and March 1850, where he met future judge Edwin B. Crocker, brother of railroad baron Charles Crocker, for whom he would paint more than 25 portraits of notable Californians.

Discovery of Humboldt Bay
In the early part of March 1850, Shaw left San Francisco on the schooner Laura Virginia, under Captain Douglas Ottenger. At anchor near Trinidad on April 7, expedition director E.H. Howard selected Shaw and four others to go ashore at Trinidad Bay to locate the entrance to Humboldt Bay from shore. The six men walked down the beach, were ferried across the Mad River by Indians, and camped for the night on the spit north of the entrance to Humboldt Bay. The next day, the shore party walked back to Trinidad and was picked up by the Laura Virginia.

On April 9, 1850, second mate Hans Henry Buhne piloted the first landing craft over the bar and into Humboldt Bay. Later that same day, two more boatloads of passengers and supplies were landed. On April 14, Buhne piloted the Laura Virginia over the bar and into the bay near the tents of the shore party. Shaw sketched the first views of the bay and insisted the bay be named honoring Prussian naturalist Alexander von Humboldt. On April 26, 1850, the San Francisco Daily Journal of Commerce published a wood engraving based on his sketches of Humboldt Bay. Shaw returned to San Francisco on the steamer Sea Gull April 5, 1851.

From Sutter's to farming in Humboldt County

In 1851, Shaw spent much of the year with John Augustus Sutter at Hock Farm on the Feather River as the family portrait painter and general business agent. Following a brief engagement to Sutter's daughter, Ann "Eliza" Sutter (1828 - March 1895), Shaw returned to San Francisco, and later that year, with his brother Seth Shaw and Willard Allen, settled on Table Bluff, near Loleta.

In summer 1852, they moved across the Eel River and began clearing the area where the town of Ferndale, California, would later be incorporated. In the rainy winter of 1852–1853, twelve men, including Seth Kinman, stayed with the Shaws because theirs was the most finished cabin. Shaw spent the next two years coaxing plants to grow in the cold coastal fog. Around 1852, he painted the portrait of Wiyot elder Kiwelattah (or Ki-we-lah-tah). Finally, with little to show for his labors, Shaw returned to San Francisco in 1854 and later sold his claim to Ferndale settler Francis Francis, in 1856.

San Francisco portrait painter
Shaw moved quickly in the big city, setting up studio, joining the Mason's California Lodge No. 1 in San Francisco June 1, 1854 and painting more than 200 portraits of Masonic Officers, possibly from photographs. Shaw took first prize for best portrait in oils at the 1860 California State Fair.

On April 18, 1861, Shaw married Mary Frances Meacham at the First Unitarian Church in San Francisco. Shaw grew grapes and is credited with introducing wine grape cultivation to Sonoma County. The Shaws had two children before Mary died October 2, 1866. Shaw spent 1871 abroad and married Lucretia Swain of Nantucket, Massachusetts August 12, 1873, on his return to San Francisco.

Shaw died February 14, 1900, in San Francisco, memorialized in an obituary in the San Francisco Examiner, 16 February 1900.

Memberships
Shaw was a member of the Masons, the Society of California Pioneers, The Bohemian Club, the Mechanics' Institute and the San Francisco Art Association.

Paintings and manuscripts
Many of Shaw's paintings were lost to the fires of the 1906 San Francisco earthquake; those remaining are known to be in collections of the Bancroft Library, M. H. de Young Memorial Museum, Fine Arts Museum of San Francisco, the Oakland Museum, City of New Orleans, Nantucket Historical Society, the Crocker Art Museum of Sacramento, The Ferndale Museum, The Clarke Historical Museum, and the Society of California Pioneers. Shaw painted several family portraits including his mother Elizabeth Barrett Shaw (c. 1860s), brother Sylvanus Harvey Shaw (both at the Ferndale Museum), and brother Seth Shaw (Ferndale's Masonic Temple). Shaw descendants preserve another portrait of Seth, a portrait of Seth's wife Isabella Shaw, a small landscape, a self-portrait by Steven Shaw and his original copy of A Record Book of the Farm.

Notables painted by Shaw include:
Louis Agassiz, Harvard Naturalist
Col. Edward D. Baker, U.S. Senator and confidant of Abraham Lincoln (E.B. Crocker Collection #196)
R.B. Blowers, Woodland, California, grower and grape transport pioneer (E.B. Crocker Collection #748)
Peter Burnett, first governor of California, (E.B. Crocker Collection #210)
David C. Broderick, U.S. Senator, (E.B. Crocker Collection #206)
Charles Crocker, 1872 (E.B. Crocker Collection #383)
Judge E.B. Crocker, 1872 (E.B. Crocker Collection #384)
Isaac Elphinston Davis, (1833–1888) passenger on the Alexander von Humboldt (private collection)
Mrs. Isaac Elphinston Davis (private collection)
John Brooks Felton, half-length oil portrait (Bancroft Library)
Capt. J.L. Folsom (E.B. Crocker Collection #205)
John W. Geary, first mayor of San Francisco
Hon. Edward Gilbert, (E.B. Crocker Collection #193)
William M. Gwin, U.S. Senator, (E.B. Crocker Collection #200)
Col. Jack Hays, sheriff of San Francisco 1850 (E.B. Crocker Collection #211)
Thomas Hill, American landscape artist, (E.B. Crocker Collection #207)
Collis P. Huntington, 1872 (E.B. Crocker Collection #380)
Maj. Gen. H.W. Halleck, General, lawyer and land speculator, (E.B. Crocker Collection #195)
Mark Hopkins, 1872 (E.B. Crocker Collection #387)
Andrew Jackson, seventh United States President. 1872, (E.B. Crocker Collection #87)
Thomas Starr King, Unitarian Minister, (E.B. Crocker Collection #197)
Kiwelattah (or Ki-we-lah-tah), c.1852 full-length painting of Wiyot elder (Clarke Historical Museum)
Thomas O. Larkin, U.S. Consulm (E.B. Crocker Collection #209)
Peter Lassen, California Pioneer (E.B. Crocker Collection #198)
Jacob P. Leese, California Pioneer (E.B. Crocker Collection #203)
Alfred Macy, (1831–1874) Governor's Council of Massachusetts (Nantucket Historical Society)
S.S. Montague, Chief engineer Central Pacific Railroad, (E.B. Crocker Collection #385)
William C. Ralston, founder of the Bank of California (M. H. de Young Memorial Museum)
Hon. Romualdo Pacheco, American politician and diplomat (E.B. Crocker Collection #208)
Samuel Purdy, (E.B. Crocker Collection #204)
Edmond Randolph, (1818–1861) California lawyer and historian (E.B. Crocker Collection #199)
Robert Robinson, (E.B. Crocker Collection #202)
Brigadier General Persifor Frazer Smith, 1848 (City of New Orleans)
Leland Stanford, 1872 (E.B. Crocker Collection #382)
Col. J.D. Stevenson, mining and real estate entrepreneur (E.B. Crocker Collection #192)
General John A. Sutter, June 1851 (Bancroft Library)
General John A. Sutter, (E.B. Crocker Collection #194 - different than 1851 portrait)
Mariano Vallejo, Californian military commander, politician, and rancher, (E.B. Crocker Collection #201)
Vallejo family portraits (Vallejo Home State Park, Sonoma, California)
Zachary Taylor, 1846 then General in the Mexican–American War, later President of the United States.

References

People from Windsor, Vermont
Artists from San Francisco
California Gold Rush
People from Humboldt County, California
Artists of the American West
American portrait painters
1817 births
1900 deaths
Painters from Vermont
Painters from California
19th-century American painters
19th-century American male artists
American male painters